The 1911–12 Missouri Tigers men's basketball team represented University of Missouri in the 1911–12 college basketball season. The team was led by first year head coach O.F. Field.  The captain of the team was Joseph Parker.

Missouri finished with a 5–10 record overall and a 4–9 record in the Missouri Valley Intercollegiate Athletic Association.  This was good enough for a 3rd-place finish in the regular season conference standings.

Schedule and results

References

Missouri Tigers men's basketball seasons
Missouri
Tiger
Tiger